Brisbane North Cougars are an Australian netball team based in Brisbane. Their senior team plays in the HART Sapphire Series. They also enter teams in Netball Queensland's Ruby Series as well as under-18 and under-16 competitions.

History
Brisbane North Cougars Netball Club was established in 2001. They represent five netball associations based in Brisbane, including the Queensland Catholic Netball Association and associations based in Downey Park, Pine Rivers and Redcliffe. They have been one of Queensland's most successful netball clubs, making regular grand final appearances and winning regular premierships. Between 2001 and 2018 they competed in a series of state leagues organised by Netball Queensland, including the Dairy Farmers Cup, the Holden Astra Cup, the Holden Cruze Cup, the Queensland Champions Cup and the Queensland State Netball League. In 2019, along with Bond University Bull Sharks, Carina Leagues Club Tigers, Ipswich Jets, USC Thunder, Northern Rays and QUT Wildcats, they were founding members of the HART Sapphire Series. Cougars were subsequently Sapphire premiers in 2020 and 2021.

Grand finals

Division 1
Dairy Farmers Cup

Holden Astra Cup

Holden Cruze Cup

Queensland Champions Cup

Mission Queensland State Netball League Division 1

HART Sapphire Series

Division 2
President's Cup – Under 19

Ergon Energy League

Queensland State Netball League

Queensland State Netball League Division 2

Ruby Series

Notable players

Internationals

 Laura Scherian

 Tara Hinchliffe

Queensland Firebirds
 Macy Gardner
 Tara Hinchliffe

Sunshine Coast Lightning
 Tara Hinchliffe
 Laura Scherian

Premierships
Division 1
Winners: 2001, 2002, 2003, 2004, 2005, 2007, 2010, 2011, 2013, 2015, 2016, 2017, 2018, 2020, 2021: 15   
Runners Up: 2008, 2012, 2019: 3
Division 2
Winners:2005, 2007, 2010, 2011, 2013, 2015, 2016, 2017, 2021: 9   
Runners Up: 2004, 2006, 2009, 2012, 2014, 2020: 6

References

External links
   Brisbane North Cougars on Facebook
 Brisbane North Cougars on Instagram

Netball teams in Queensland
Queensland state netball league teams
Sports clubs established in 2001
2001 establishments in Australia
Sporting clubs in Brisbane